Christopher Bodkin (or Bodkyn or Bodekin) (died 1572) was an Irish prelate,  who was the Archbishop of Tuam, and Bishop of Kilmacduagh during the Irish Reformation.

Biography
He was appointed Bishop of Kilmacduagh on 3 September 1533 and consecrated on 4 November 1533. Four years later, he accepted Royal Supremacy and was appointed Archbishop of Tuam by King Henry VIII on 15 February 1537, but continued to hold the bishopric of Kilmacduagh. He swore the Oath of Supremacy at Clonmel early in 1539.

In opposition to Bodkin, the papacy appointed Arthur O'Friel to Tuam and Cornelius O'Dea to Kilmacduagh, but they failed to get possession of the sees. On the accession of Queen Mary I, Bodkin was absolved from schism by Cardinal Pole, and appointed apostolic administrator of Tuam and Kilmacduagh on 7 October 1555.

On the accession of Queen Elizabeth I, he retained possession of both sees. He took the Oath of Supremacy, recognizing the Queen as Supreme Governor of the Church, in 1560   He died in office in 1572.

References

 Dictionary of Irish Biography, p. 625, Cambridge, 2010.

|-

|-

1572 deaths
16th-century Irish Anglican priests
People from County Galway
Anglican archbishops of Tuam
Roman Catholic archbishops of Tuam
Year of birth unknown